In Greek mythology, Neonus (Ancient Greek: Νεώνου) was a Phthian prince as the son of King Hellen of Thessaly, the son of Deucalion, the Hellenic progenitor. His mother was possibly the nymph Orseis (Othreis), and thus probably the brother to Aeolus, Dorus, Xuthus and Xenopatra. Neonus was the father of Dotus, eponym of Dotium in Thessaly.

Note

References 
 Stephanus of Byzantium, Stephani Byzantii Ethnica: Volumen II Delta - Iota, edited by Margarethe Billerbeck and Christian Zubler, De Gruyter, 2011. . Online version at De Gruyter. Internet Archive. Google Books.

Princes in Greek mythology
Deucalionids
Thessalian characters in Greek mythology
Thessalian mythology